Nipponentomon macleani is a species of proturan in the family Acerentomidae found in North America. It is a type of soil-dwelling organism.

References

Further reading

 

Protura
Articles created by Qbugbot
Animals described in 1977